Sir Goddard Pemberton (d. 1616) was an English landowner and Member of Parliament.

He was a son of Robert Pemberton of Rushden and Margaret Throckmorton, a daughter Richard Throckmorton of Higham Ferrers.

Pemberton greatly benefitted by his marriage and the political influence of Sir John Stanhope the husband of his sister-in-law Margaret Macwilliam. His home was Hertingfordbury House, where he hosted King James and Anne of Denmark for a day in July 1605.

He was Member of Parliament for Higham Ferrers in 1604 and Sheriff of Hertfordshire in 1615.

He married Susannah, daughter of Henry Macwilliam and widow of Edward Saunders. Some sources say she was a daughter of Sir Thomas Cheek, her mother was Mary Cheke.

He died on 1 August 1616 of the "new ague or sickness", and was buried at Rushden. His widow married Thomas Ireland.

References

1616 deaths